Daniela Porcelli (born 15 October 1961) is an Italian sprinter. She competed in the women's 4 × 400 metres relay at the 1980 Summer Olympics.

References

External links
 

1961 births
Living people
Athletes (track and field) at the 1980 Summer Olympics
Italian female sprinters
Italian female middle-distance runners
Olympic athletes of Italy
Sportspeople from Cagliari
Olympic female sprinters
20th-century Italian women
21st-century Italian women